L. Philip Lounibos is an American entomologist.

Lounibos focuses on the biology of mosquitos, malaria, dengue, vector-borne disease, medical entomology and biological control, and invasion biology.  He is currently Distinguished Professor at University of Florida.

References

Living people
University of Florida faculty
American entomologists
Harvard University alumni
University of Notre Dame alumni
Year of birth missing (living people)